Game of Clones is an American reality television dating game show based on a British show of the same name. It premiered on MTV on February 21, 2019.

Cast

Episodes

International versions

References

External links
 Game of Clones at MTV
 

2010s American game shows
2010s American reality television series
2019 American television series debuts
MTV game shows
American dating and relationship reality television series